This is a list of members of the 27th Legislative Assembly of Queensland from 1935 to 1938, as elected at the 1935 state election held on 11 May 1935.

  On 28 November 1935, the Labor member for Toowoomba, Evan Llewelyn, resigned. Labor candidate Jack Duggan won the resulting by-election on 14 December 1935.
  On 3 January 1936, the Labor member for Brisbane, Robert Funnell, died. Labor candidate Johnno Mann won the resulting by-election on 4 April 1936.
  On 5 January 1936, the Country (CPNP) member for Keppel, Owen Daniel, died. Country (CPNP) candidate David Daniel won the resulting by-election on 4 April 1936.
  On 28 March 1936, the Labor member for Bowen, Charles Collins, died. Labor candidate Ernest Riordan won the resulting by-election on 20 June 1936.
  On 30 November 1936, the Labor member for Maryborough, James Stopford, died. Labor candidate William Demaine won the resulting by-election on 27 February 1937.
  The Labor member for Warrego, Randolph Bedford, resigned on 8 September 1937 to contest the federal seat of Maranoa. He was re-elected the resulting by-election on 4 December 1937.

See also
1935 Queensland state election
Forgan Smith Ministry (Labor) (1932–1942)

References

 Queensland Year Book (1937), "Members of the State Parliament"
 

Members of Queensland parliaments by term
20th-century Australian politicians